The 2021–22 season is the 119th season in the existence of Go Ahead Eagles and the club's first season back in the top flight of Dutch football. In addition to the domestic league, Go Ahead Eagles will participate in this season's editions of the KNVB Cup.

Players

First-team squad

Transfers

In

Out

Pre-season and friendlies

Competitions

Overall record

Eredivisie

League table

Results summary

Results by round

Matches
The league fixtures were announced on 11 June 2021.

KNVB Cup

References

Go Ahead Eagles seasons
Go Ahead Eagles